Mark Aylor (born January 11, 1978 in Santa Clara, California) is a former American rugby union flanker. He was a member of the United States national rugby union team that participated in the 2007 Rugby World Cup.

Aylor now works as a chiropractor for POWER: Advanced Chiropractic Health Center.

References

1978 births
Living people
Rugby union props
American rugby union players
United States international rugby union players